Loni is a village in Ambegaon taluka of Pune District in the state of Maharashtra, India.The village is administrated by a Sarpanch who is an elected representative of village as per constitution of India and Panchayati raj (India). According to the 2011 census, the village has a population of 2,599 people.

References

External links
  Villages in pune maharashtra

Villages in Pune district